Giuseppe Attardi (September 14, 1923 – April 5, 2008) was an American molecular biologist of Italian origin, a professor at the  California Institute of Technology in Pasadena. He made pioneering studies on the human mitochondrial structure and function.

He received the Gairdner Foundation International Award in 1998 for his contributions to medical science and was selected jointly with Douglas C. Wallace for the 2000 Passano Award "for their landmark contributions to the mitochondrial genome project and their development of innovative methods for studying mitochondrial genetics and human disease".

He was a member of the United States National Academy of Sciences from 1984.

References

External links

 Anne Chomyn, "Giuseppe Attardi", Biographical Memoirs of the National Academy of Sciences (2015)

1923 births
2008 deaths
American geneticists
Members of the United States National Academy of Sciences